Oebalus ypsilongriseus is a species of stink bug in the family Pentatomidae. It is native to South America, where it is known to feed on rice crops, as well as cotton, barley, oat, and wheat.

References

Further reading

External links

 
 

Insects described in 1773
Pentatomini
Taxa named by Charles De Geer